People is officially Howard Jones's seventh album, released in 1998. After the US release on Ark 21 Records, People was a global release via Jones' own record label dtox. The album is a reworked version of the 1997 Japanese-only release Angels & Lovers. The title track and "When Lovers Confess" were deleted and three new tracks added: "Tomorrow Is Now", "Everything", and "Let the People Have Their Say". The album did not chart in the UK. However, the single "Let the People Have Their Say" broke the top 100 barrier in the UK and received ample air play on BBC Radio 2. The tri-fold slip case version features the faces of 210 people, all friends, family and fans of Jones.

To promote the album, a tour was organised. Jones' band consisted of former Kajagoogoo bassist Nick Beggs, guitarist Robin Boult and on drums the late Kevin Wilkinson who has played with China Crisis.
Howard also toured the US with Culture Club and The Human League playing a host of hits and songs from the album in large arenas.

Track listing

Track 4 has a different version on the European versions of this album.  Roy Jones (co-writer of lyrics for tracks 7 and 9) is Howard's brother.

Personnel
 Howard Jones - lead and backing vocals, keyboards, acoustic piano, electric piano, Hammond organ
 Robbie Bronnimann - keyboards, programming
 Robin Boult - guitar
 Eric Gales - guitar
 Andy Ross - guitar, tambourine
 Pino Palladino - bass 
 Greg Wells - bass
 Keith Wilkinson -  bass
 Stewart Copeland - drums
 Kevin Wilkinson - drums
 Luis Jardim - percussion
 Carole Steele - percussion
 Kevin Robinson - flugelhorn, trumpet
 David Hughes - cello
 Katie Kissoon - backing vocals
 Sylvia Mason-James - backing vocals
 Beverley Skeete - backing vocals
 Woodlands Hospice Community Choir - choir (7), directed by Tyndale Thomas

Production
 Producers: Howard Jones and Andy Ross
 Engineers: Avril Mackintosh and Stephen Taylor
 Mixing: Bob Clearmountain, Howard Jones, Avril Mackintosh, Andy Ross and Stephen Taylor.
 Mastered by Bob Ludwig at Gateway Mastering (Portland, ME).
 Artwork and Design: Paul Ridout
 Photography: Simon Fowler

Notes 

Howard Jones (English musician) albums
1998 albums